Gerry O'Rourke is a former Irish wheelchair athlete. At the 1984 Summer Paralympics, he won a silver medal in the 400 metre wheelchair race and a bronze in both the 100 and 800 metre races. In 1986, he won the fourth London Marathon men's wheelchair race, defeating the 1985 and 1987 champion Chris Hallam after Hallam was slowed by illness and mechanical problems. He is also a three-time winner of the Dublin Marathon.

References

External links
 

Year of birth missing (living people)
Living people
Paralympic athletes of Ireland
Athletes (track and field) at the 1984 Summer Paralympics
Paralympic silver medalists for Ireland
Paralympic bronze medalists for Ireland
Irish male wheelchair racers
Paralympic wheelchair racers
Medalists at the 1984 Summer Paralympics
Paralympic medalists in athletics (track and field)